Aito Mäkinen (4 January 1927 – 30 January 2017) was a Finnish film director, screenwriter and film producer. He directed more than 45 films between 1963 and 1999. His 1964 film, Onnelliset leikit, was entered into the 4th Moscow International Film Festival.

Selected filmography
 Onnelliset leikit (1964)

References

External links

1927 births
2017 deaths
People from Turku
Finnish film directors
Finnish screenwriters
Finnish film producers